The yellow-browed camaroptera (Camaroptera superciliaris) is a species of bird in the family Cisticolidae.
It is found in Angola, Benin, Cameroon, Central African Republic, Republic of the Congo, Democratic Republic of the Congo, Ivory Coast, Equatorial Guinea, Gabon, Ghana, Guinea, Liberia, Nigeria, Sierra Leone, Togo, and Uganda.
Its natural habitats are subtropical or tropical moist lowland forests and subtropical or tropical moist shrubland.

The yellow-browed camaroptera was described by the English zoologist Louis Fraser in 1843 under the binomial name Sylvicola superciliaris. The type locality is the island of Bioko (formerly Fernando Pó) in the Gulf of Guinea off the west coast of Africa. The specific epithet superciliaris is from the New Latin superciliaris,  "eyebrowed" from the classical Latin supercilium, "eyebrow".

References

yellow-browed camaroptera
Birds of the Gulf of Guinea
Birds of Sub-Saharan Africa
yellow-browed camaroptera
yellow-browed camaroptera
Taxonomy articles created by Polbot